The 1975 Paris–Tours was the 69th edition of the Paris–Tours cycle race and was held on 28 September 1975. The race started in Tours and finished in Versailles. The race was won by Freddy Maertens.

General classification

References

1975 in French sport
1975
September 1975 sports events in Europe
1975 Super Prestige Pernod